The Agricultural Hall of Fame of Quebec (French: Temple de la renommée de l'agriculture du Québec) honours and celebrates those who have made a lasting contribution to the advancement of the field of agriculture in the province of Quebec, Canada.

A non-profit association founded in 1991 and located in Saint-Hyacinthe, Quebec, the Agricultural Hall of Fame of Quebec is currently administered by a board of 9 individuals elected during a general assembly that is held on a yearly basis.

Gallery 

The hall of fame exposes portraits of its inductees in a gallery. The gallery used to be located at the ExpoCité complex in Quebec City but was moved to the La Coop building in Saint-Hyacinthe in 2014. Candidates for induction are submitted by member of the association who then form a selection committee. The year's inductees are honored during a banquet after the general assembly where their portraits are unveiled and permanently hung in the gallery.

Notable inductees

See also 

 Canadian Agricultural Hall of Fame
 List of agriculture awards

References 

Halls of fame in Canada
Awards established in 1991
1991 establishments in Quebec
Agriculture awards
Quebec awards